The historic county of Huntingdonshire, located in the modern-day East of England region, has been represented in the Parliament of the United Kingdom since the 13th century. This article provides the list of constituencies which have formed the parliamentary representation from Huntingdonshire.

In 1889 the area of the historic county formed the administrative county of Huntingdonshire. In 1965 the administrative county was merged with the Soke of Peterborough. Peterborough had been an administrative county which was part of the historic county of Northamptonshire. In 1974 Huntingdon and Peterborough was combined with the administrative county of Cambridgeshire and Isle of Ely, to form a new expanded non-metropolitan county of Cambridgeshire.

The first part of this article covers the constituencies wholly or predominantly within the area of the historic county of Huntingdonshire, both before and after the administrative changes of 1889, 1965 and 1974. The second part refers to constituencies mostly in another historic county, which included some territory from the historic county of Huntingdonshire. The summaries section only refers to the constituencies included in the first section of the constituency list. For more information on the constituencies currently covering the modern-day ceremonial county of Cambridgeshire, see List of parliamentary constituencies in Cambridgeshire.

List of constituencies
Key to abbreviations:

Type: 
BC: Borough constituency
CC: County constituency

Notes:
C: non-metropolitan/ceremonial county of Cambridgeshire (from 1974)
H1: historic county of Huntingdonshire (until 1889)
H2: administrative county of Huntingdonshire (1889-1965)
HP: administrative county of Huntingdon and Peterborough (1965-1974).

Note: Dates of representation prior to 1654 are provisional. The constituencies which existed in 1707 were previously represented in the Parliament of England.

Constituencies wholly or predominantly in the historic county

Note: North West Cambridgeshire does not include any part of the historic county of Cambridgeshire. It combines ten wards of the District of Huntingdonshire (part of the historic county of Huntingdonshire) and a smaller number of wards from the City of Peterborough (part of the historic county of Northamptonshire).

Constituencies mostly in another historic county

Periods constituencies represented

Summaries

Summary of Constituencies by Type and Period

Summary of Members of Parliament by Type and Period

See also
 Wikipedia:Index of article on UK Parliament constituencies in England
 Wikipedia:Index of articles on UK Parliament constituencies in England N-Z
 Parliamentary representation by historic counties
 First Protectorate Parliament
 Unreformed House of Commons

References
 Boundaries of Parliamentary Constituencies 1885-1972, compiled and edited by F.W.S. Craig (Parliamentary Reference Publications 1972)
 British Parliamentary Constituencies: A Statistical Compendium, by Ivor Crewe and Anthony Fox (Faber and Faber 1984)
 British Parliamentary Election Results 1832-1885, compiled and edited by F.W.S. Craig (The Macmillan Press 1977)
 The House of Commons 1509-1558, by S.T. Bindoff (Secker & Warburg 1982)
 The House of Commons 1558-1603, by P.W. Hasler (HMSO 1981)
 The House of Commons 1660-1690, by Basil Duke Henning (Secker & Warburg 1983)
 The House of Commons 1715-1754, by Romney Sedgwick (HMSO 1970)
 The House of Commons 1754-1790, by Sir Lewis Namier and John Brooke (HMSO 1964)
 The House of Commons 1790-1820, by R.G. Thorne (Secker & Warburg 1986)
 The Parliaments of England by Henry Stooks Smith (1st edition published in three volumes 1844–50), second edition edited (in one volume) by F.W.S. Craig (Political Reference Publications 1973) out of copyright

Huntingdonshire, Historic county of
History of Huntingdonshire
Politics of Huntingdonshire